Hussein "Hassani" Alwan  (born 1 January 1955) is a former Iraqi football midfielder who played for Iraq in the 1976 AFC Asian Cup. He played for the national team between 1975 and 1976.

References

Iraqi footballers
Iraq international footballers
1976 AFC Asian Cup players
Living people
1955 births
Association football midfielders